Ken Boyd (born March 25, 1952) is an American retired basketball player born in Frederick, Maryland.

A 6'5" forward from Boston University Then was selected by the New Orleans Jazz in the 9th round of the 1974 NBA draft.  He played six games for the Jazz during the 1974–75 NBA season, averaging 3.2 points, 0.8 rebounds, and 0.3 assists per game. Boyd Also played one season with the Quincy Chiefs of Massachusetts in the Eastern Basketball Association (EBA). His Stats for that year 1977–1978 are not specified.

External links

1952 births
Living people
American men's basketball players
Basketball players from Maryland
Boston University Terriers men's basketball players
New Orleans Jazz draft picks
New Orleans Jazz players
Small forwards
Sportspeople from Frederick, Maryland